Bi'tha is an Arabic word meaning 'sending'. It usually refers to the sending of Muhammad to the people of the world, when the angel Jibril brought to him the first verses (ayat) of the Qur'an in the Cave of Hira on Jabal al-Nur near Mecca in 610 AD. It is often used as a reference point for dates before the Hijra or migration to Medina in 622 by Muslims (e.g. an event took place x years after the Bi'tha).

References
http://www.anewlife.ca/teaching/online/themes.php

Arabic words and phrases